Tadmor is an extinct town in Montgomery County, in the U.S. state of Ohio.  Its location, is now within the Vandalia city limits.

History
A post office called Tadmer was established in 1867, the name was changed to Tadmor in 1884, and the post office closed in 1917. Besides the post office, Tadmor had a station on the Dayton and Michigan Railroad.

References

Geography of Montgomery County, Ohio
Ghost towns in Ohio